Darti (also Romanized as Dārtī; also known as Dārtūt) is a village in Koregah-e Gharbi Rural District, in the Central District of Khorramabad County, Lorestan Province, Iran. At the 2006 census, its population was 42, in 10 families.

References 

Towns and villages in Khorramabad County